Empis caudatula is a species of dance flies, in the fly family Empididae. It is included in the subgenus Empis. It is found in central and northern Europe.

References

External links
Fauna Europaea

Empis
Asilomorph flies of Europe
Insects described in 1867
Taxa named by Hermann Loew